The South Dakota Dept. of Transportation Bridge No. 20-153-210 is a historic bridge in Deuel County, South Dakota. It is a single-span Pratt pony truss bridge,  in length, resting on steel pilings with metal wing walls. It has corrugated metal decking resting on I-beam stringers. The bridge was built in 1908, and was originally located at a site in Herrick Township. Moved to its present location in 1960, it is the only known surviving bridge in Deuel County built by the Security Bridge Company, which held county contracts for bridge construction between 1907 and 1913.

The bridge was listed on the National Register of Historic Places in 1993.

See also
List of bridges on the National Register of Historic Places in South Dakota

References

Road bridges on the National Register of Historic Places in South Dakota
Bridges completed in 1960
Buildings and structures in Deuel County, South Dakota
National Register of Historic Places in Deuel County, South Dakota
Metal bridges in the United States
Truss bridges in the United States